Nicholas William Robert Thompson is a British businessperson who is the deputy managing director of Blackpool Pleasure Beach. He rose to the position following the death of his father in 2004.

Career highlights

Major Installations
So far during Nick Thompson's tenure, he has been involved in the installation of many major attractions at the Pleasure Beach.

Personal life
Nick married his fiance Stina Dahslrud in a private ceremony in 2004.

References

External links

1968 births
Living people
Blackpool Pleasure Beach
English businesspeople